Reg Allen (12 April 1917 – 30 March 1989) was an American set decorator. He was nominated for an Academy Award in the category Best Art Direction for the film Lady Sings the Blues.

Selected filmography
 The Pink Panther (1963)
 The Party (1968)
 Lady Sings the Blues (1972)

References

External links

1917 births
1989 deaths
American set decorators